James Scarlett may refer to:
 Sir James Yorke Scarlett (1799–1871), British soldier and hero of the Crimean War
 James Scarlett, 1st Baron Abinger (1769–1844), English lawyer, politician and judge
 James Scarlett-Streatfeild (1909–1945), Royal Air Force squadron commander
 James Scarlett, 4th Baron Abinger (1871–1903), British peer
 James Scarlett, 8th Baron Abinger (1914–2002), British peer